Ammo is a colloquial term for ammunition.

Ammo or AMMO may also refer to:
 Ammo (musician)
 DJ Ammo, stage name of Damien LeRoy
Munitions Systems Specialist (U.S. Air Force), nicknamed "AMMO"